K N Ramachandra is an Indian politician .. He was elected to the Tamil Nadu legislative assembly a candidate from Andimadam constituency in 1967 election.

Before being elected to the State Assembly, he was a professor and a scholar at government colleges. During his time as a professor, he was a lieutenant in the National Cadet Corps. He graduated with an honours degree in Tamil from Pachaiyappa's College, Madras (now Chennai). His close friend and classmate was Murasoli Maran former Member of Parliament and Minister of Industry and Commerce, Government of India. Ramachandran's contemporaries at the college were Nanjil K Manoharan and Dr Chokalingam. Former Finance Minister K Anabazhagan was Ramachandran's lecturer and their friendship continues.

Ramachandran is the author of two books: one each on Aringer Anna and Thanthai Periyar which were honoured as non-detailed books in high schools all over Tamil Nadu during the late 1960s and early 1970s.

References 

1955 births
All India Anna Dravida Munnetra Kazhagam politicians
Living people
India MPs 2014–2019
Lok Sabha members from Tamil Nadu
People from Kanchipuram district